Patrick Doeplah (27 October 199022 March 2011) was a Liberian footballer who played at both professional and international levels as a striker.

Career

Club career
Doeplah spent his youth career with Gardnersville and Roots, before playing senior football with Mighty Barrolle and LISCR. At the latter club, he was the subject of interest from Ghanaian side Asante Kotoko.

He instead signed on loan for Israeli club Hapoel Kfar Saba for the 2009–2010 season, before the deal was later made permanent.

International career
Doeplah earned two caps for Liberia in 2010.

Death
Doeplah died on 22 March 2011 at the age of 20.

Career statistics

References

1990 births
2011 deaths
Liberian footballers
Liberia international footballers
Mighty Barrolle players
LISCR FC players
Hapoel Kfar Saba F.C. players
Liga Leumit players
Expatriate footballers in Israel
Liberian expatriate sportspeople in Israel
Sportspeople from Monrovia
Association football forwards